The Fabrianese is a modern breed of domestic sheep from the Marche region of central Italy. It takes its name from the town and comune of Fabriano, in the province of Ancona. The Fabrianese was created as a dual-purpose breed in the 1960s by cross-breeding local breeds of the Apennines of the Marche with rams of the Bergamasca breed from the Alps of Lombardy. It is raised in the eastern foothills of the Apennines, in the provinces of Ancona, Ascoli Piceno and Macerata in the Marche, and in the province of Terni in Umbria.

History

The Fabrianese is one of the seventeen autochthonous Italian sheep breeds for which a genealogical herdbook is kept by the Associazione Nazionale della Pastorizia, the Italian national association of sheep-breeders; the herdbook was established in 1974. In 1983 the breed population was estimated at about 25,000 head, of which 4600 were registered. In 1997 the total number was about 70,000. In 2013 the number registered for the breed was 3342.

Use

References 

Sheep breeds
Sheep breeds originating in Italy